Guruguru Eigakan (グルグル映畫館) was a Japanese visual kei rock band formed in 1995 by Amano Tonbimaru. The band suspended their activities in 2012.

History

Guruguru Eigakan had their first live performance on November 11, 1995 at the Nagoya Music Farm.

Members

Former members
 Guitar – Numakura Shin (沼倉真) 
 Bass – Tamakoshi Isao (玉腰勲) 
 Drums – Maeda Kazutomo (前田一知)
 Bass and vocals – Yoshikawa Masatoshi (吉川昌利) 
 Guitar – Yamada Shunsuke (山田俊介)
 Drums – Matsushima Kouji (松島広治)
 Vocals – Amano Tonbimaru (天野鳶丸) (Deceased)

Discography

Demo tapes
モボ (Mobo) (August, 1996)
モガ (Moga) (August, 1996)
劇場の三科 (Gekijō no mishina) (December, 1996)
エログロイノセンス (Eroguroi Innocence) (September, 1997）
青が好きだった子供 (Ao ga sukidatta kodomo) (December, 1997)
カストリミウヂック (Kasutori Music)
ミィンナ悩んで大人になった。 (Minna nayande otona ni natta.) (December 12, 2000)
三河湾純情ラプソディー／伏見桃山ブルース (Mikawawan Junjō Rhapsody/Fushimi momoyama Blues) (July 4, 2001)

Singles
赤い蛇 (Akai hebi) (August 20, 2000)
上下左右 (Jōgesaū) (April 1, 2002)
未来派探偵ダンIII世〜11月15日発売の謎 (Miraiha tanteidan sansei ～11/15 hatsubai no nazo～) (November 15, 2003)
あら、カルト。 (Ara, cult.) (January 6, 2004)
14歳の斜陽 (14sai no shayō) (April 25, 2007)
破戒 / 想像 (Hakai/sōzō) (December 17, 2008)
或阿呆の半生前編〜さいせんじがけだらなよさ〜 (Aru aho no hansei zenpen 〜sai senji-gakedara na yo sa〜) (April 14, 2010)

Albums
何処の青さに君、負けた。 (Doko no aosa ni kimi, maketa.) (June 6, 1999)
境の朱さの所為なのです。 (Sakai no akasa no sei nano desu.) (March 4, 2000)
凡人白書-浪漫主義が過ぎました。- (Bonjin hakusho -romanshugi ga sugimashita.-) (December 12, 2000)
ナンセンス　意味は無いケド　意義が有る (Nonsense imi wa nai kedo igi ga aru) (July 4, 2001)
轍 (Wadachi) (January 4, 2002)
そのままでいいよ。 (Sono mama de ii yo.) (November 14, 2002)
恋ころん。君にはコロン、部屋無音。 (Koi koron. Kimi ni wa koron, heya muon.) (May 15, 2003)
センテンス　意味は有るケド　硝子張り (Sentence imi wa aru kedo garasubari) (June 4, 2003)
ドロップス＋bootleg＋2 (drops+bootleg+2)（May 1, 2004）
良いコトが在ると思うな思えば負けよ-君と僕の彼岸の歌より抜粋- (Yoi koto ga aru to omou na omoeba makeyo -Kimi to boku no higan no uta yori bassui-) (June 4, 2005)
嫌な死 (Iyana shi) (July 4, 2006)
凶子の恐怖の深夜ラヂヲ (Kyōko no kyōfu no shin'ya radio) (July 4, 2007)
痴人の恋 (Chijin no koi) (July 23, 2008)
或阿呆の半生後編 (Aru aho no hansei kōhen) (July 14, 2010)

DVDs
「僕」には足りない色がある。 (「Boku」 ni wa tarinai iro ga aru.) (July 4, 2004)
仁義なきタタカいのエチュード (Jingi naki tataka i no etude) (April 15, 2005)

Books
凡人白書 (Bonjin hakusho) (October 26, 2001)

Photobooks
ARTISTIC in BLACK 5 (May 25, 2006)

CDs
異形の宴(2000年7月26日)
きわもの達の快楽 (Kiwamonotachi no kairaku) (April 6, 2002)
烏合の衆 (Ugō no shū) (June 16, 2002)

VHS
異形の宴 (Igyō no utage) (August 23, 2000)

References
 Official website
 JaME Profile
 14sai no shayou Review

Japanese rock music groups
Musical groups from Aichi Prefecture
Visual kei musical groups